Vaia may refer to:

Vaia Zaganas (born 1975), Canadian boxer
Vaia (river), a river in Romania

See also
Video Artists International Audio, record label that uses the acronym VAIA